Vladimir Olgerdovich (died after 1398) was the son of Algirdas, Grand Duke of Lithuania, and his first wife Maria of Vitebsk. He was Grand Prince of Kiev (Kyiv) from 1362 to 1394. His sons Ivan and Alexander started the Belsky and Olelkovich families.

Prince of Kiev
After the battle of Blue Waters in 1362, the Principality of Kiev was attached to the Grand Duchy of Lithuania. It is believed that Vladimir was installed in Kiev right after the battle and replaced Fiodor of Kiev. Vladimir conducted independent politics and minted his own coins. Initially the coins were heavily influenced by the numismatic traditions of the Golden Horde and copied symbolism from coins minted by Khans Jani Beg and Muhammad Bolak. However, later the coins replaced the Tatar symbols (i.e. tamga) with letter K (for Kiev) and a cross (for Eastern Orthodox faith). This could indicate that for a while the Principality still had to pay tribute to the Horde. These were the first coins minted in the territory of the Grand Duchy of Lithuania.

In late 1384, Vladimir's troops detained Dionysius, the a metropolitan bishop, who died in captivity a year later. This was part of the power struggle between Dionysius, Pimen, and Cyprian for the title of Metropolitan of Moscow.

Removal from Kiev
When Jogaila became King of Poland in 1386, Vladimir swore loyalty to him. After the 1392 Ostrów Agreement, Vytautas became the Grand Duke of Lithuania and began to eliminate regional dukes replacing them with appointed regents. This campaign could have been launched to discipline disloyal dukes, but turned into a systematic effort to centralize the state. In 1393, Vytautas confiscated Volodymyr-Volynskyi from Feodor, son of Liubartas, Novhorod-Siverskyi from Kaributas, Vitebsk from Švitrigaila. In 1394, Vytautas and Skirgaila marched against Vladimir, who surrendered without a battle. Skirgaila was installed in Kiev while Vladimir received the Principality of Slutsk.

Vladimir, last mentioned in written sources in October 1398, was the 4th great-grandfather of Elizabeth Báthory.

References

Year of birth unknown
1398 deaths
Gediminids